Dog exhibition can refer to:

Dog show or conformation show, the most-common meaning, in which dogs are rated for how well their appearance conforms to a standard
Obedience trial 
Obedience training
Dog agility trial 
Sheepdog trial
Field trial
Specialty show 
Tracking trial
World's Ugliest Dog Contest, a dog show for ugly dogs
Dog Show, a recurring sketch on Saturday Night Live

See also

Dog sports
Dog Show (album)
Best of Breed
Best in Show (film)
Breed Groups (dog)